National Solidarity (abbreviated E.A.) was the social welfare organization of the EAM resistance movement in occupied Greece during World War II.

The decision to establish a resistance organization was taken by Pantelis Karagitsis, Lefteris Apostolou and Aristotelis Bouras, who had just escaped from the internal exile imposed by the pre-war Metaxas Regime.  National Solidarity was thus founded on 28 May 1941, barely a month into the Occupation, in a park behind the Soteria hospital.  It was the first nationwide resistance group established in Greece.  Its founding members were: Kleon Papaloizos, who was also elected its secretary, Vasileios Markezinis, Dionysia Papadomichelaki, Nikos Dresios, Georgios Vasilopoulos and Spyros Antypas.

The organization participated as a founding party in the creation of the National Liberation Front (EAM) in September 1941 and henceforth functioned as its welfare arm. For its role in feeding the people during the Occupation, it was nicknamed "the Mother of the Struggle".

References

Sources
 
 "Οι αντιστασιακές οργανώσεις φύτρωναν σαν μανιτάρια" article in the Eleftherotypia newspaper, 8 April 2006 

National Liberation Front (Greece)
Welfare agencies
1941 establishments in Greece
Organizations established in 1941